Hồng Ngự is the name of the following geographical locations in Đồng Tháp Province, Vietnam:

Hồng Ngự (city), a provincial city
Hồng Ngự District, a rural district